Rhadinopasa is a monotypic moth genus in the family Sphingidae erected by Ferdinand Karsch in 1891. Its only species, Rhadinopasa hornimani, was first described by Herbert Druce in 1880. It is known from lowland forest from Gabon, Cameroon and the Central African Republic to the Democratic Republic of the Congo to Uganda and Tanzania.

The length of the forewings is 65 mm for males. Females are somewhat larger, darker and have more rounded wings. The head and body are pale orange brown. The forewings are pale orange brown to pale olive with a number of faint, wavy, parallel subbasal lines and a narrow dark longitudinal streak from the costa to the proximity of the outer margin. The outer margin and apex are yellowish and the tornal angle is very obtuse and rounded. The hindwings are pale reddish brown with a faint darker wavy submarginal band near the tornus.

Species
Rhadinopasa hornimani hornimani
Rhadinopasa hornimani tanganyikae Clark, 1938 (Tanzania)

References

Smerinthini
Monotypic moth genera
Insects of Cameroon
Insects of West Africa
Insects of Angola
Fauna of the Central African Republic
Fauna of the Republic of the Congo
Fauna of Gabon
Insects of Tanzania
Moths of Africa
Taxa named by Ferdinand Karsch